Luis Medina may refer to:

Luis Medina (baseball, born 1963), American baseball designated hitter and first baseman
Luis Medina (pitcher) (born 1999), Dominican Republic baseball pitcher
Luis Medina (athlete) (born 1952), Cuban middle-distance runner
Luis Medina (swimmer) (born 1973), Bolivian swimmer
Luis Medina Cantalejo (born 1964), Spanish football referee
Luis Caicedo Medina (born 1992), Ecuadorian footballer
Luis Manuel Medina (1968–2017), Dominican broadcast journalist